Holly Hill, also known as Holland's Hills or Rose Valley, is a historic house at Friendship, Anne Arundel County, Maryland, United States. It was initially named as Holland's Hills for Francis Holland, who bought the land in 1665. Richard Harrison, a Quaker planter and shipowner, bought the land and built a home on it. Harrison owned about 6,000 acres total.

It was originally a primitive, two-room, -story frame dwelling constructed in the fall or winter of 1698. The house is an example of Medieval Transitional architecture built in Maryland during the mid-seventeenth century. It was a quarter plantation of Richard Harrison, who likely built the original structure for his son, Samuel Harrison (1679–1733).

The inventory of Samuel Harrison's estate (1733) lists thirteen rooms, including a kitchen as well as a library of 195 books. 
Harrison's "store" or storeroom contained abundant supplies of everything from cooper's tools to tobacco boxes to India silk. Interesting features of the house include original brick vaulting in the cellar, fine paneling and moldings, ancient glass panes, batten doors with original hardware, a wall of rare marbleized paneling; and three eighteenth-century paintings on wood. In 1825, the will of Benjamin Harrison bequeathed half of the household furniture and three African-American slaves to his daughter Ann Tongue.

Ownership of Holly Hill continued in the Harrison family until 1850; then, after a brief period, it was  owned by the Scrivener family until Captain and Mrs. Hugh P. LeClair  purchased it in the late 1930s. The LeClair family completed an extensive restoration of the house and added a kitchen wing and a detached garage in faithful Tidewater style.

In 1968, Holly Hill was purchased by attorney Brice McAdoo Clagett (1933–2008) and his wife Virginia Parker Clagett. Brice was a descendant of the original builder, Richard Harrison. Clagett and his  wife added extensive ornamental plantings and gardens to the grounds near the house.

Holly Hill was listed on the National Register of Historic Places in 1971. Holly Hill is protected by conservation easements that are held by Maryland Environmental Trust and Maryland Historical Trust. It comprises .

See also
Tulip Hill
List of the oldest buildings in Maryland

References

External links

, including a photo from 1996, at the Maryland Historical Trust

Holly Hill in The Historical Marker Database

This article contains content in the public domain by the United States government.

Houses on the National Register of Historic Places in Maryland
Houses in Anne Arundel County, Maryland
Plantation houses in Maryland
Historic American Buildings Survey in Maryland
National Register of Historic Places in Anne Arundel County, Maryland